William Neilson may refer to:

William Neilson (Lord Provost), Lord Provost of Edinburgh 1717 to 1719
William Neilson (businessman) (1844–1915), Canadian businessman
William Neilson (Manitoba politician) (1854–1903), physician and politician in Manitoba, Canada
Willie Neilson (1873–1960), Scottish rugby player 
William Allan Neilson (1869–1946), Scottish-American educator
William Neilson (cricketer) (1848–1880), English-born New Zealand cricketer
William George Neilson (1862–1899), Canadian politician in the Legislative Assembly of British Columbia
Bill Neilson (1925–1989), Premier of Tasmania

See also 
William Nelson (disambiguation)